Cladonia foliacea is a species of lichen belonging to the family Cladoniaceae.

It has a cosmopolitan distribution.

References

foliacea
Lichen species
Lichens described in 1762
Taxa named by William Hudson (botanist)
Cosmopolitan species